The 1977–78 2. Bundesliga season was the fourth season of the 2. Bundesliga, the second tier of the German football league system. It was played in two regional divisions, Nord and Süd.

Arminia Bielefeld, Darmstadt 98 and 1. FC Nürnberg were promoted to the Bundesliga while 1. FC Bocholt, OSC Bremerhaven, Schwarz-Weiß Essen, FC Bayern Hof, VfR 1910 Bürstadt, Kickers Würzburg and FK Pirmasens were relegated to the Oberligas.

Nord 
For the 1977–78 season saw 1. FC Bocholt, OSC Bremerhaven and Rot-Weiß Lüdenscheid promoted to the 2. Bundesliga from the Oberliga and Amateurligas while Tennis Borussia Berlin and Rot-Weiss Essen had been relegated to the 2. Bundesliga Nord from the Bundesliga.

League table

Results

Top scorers 
The league's top scorers:

Süd
For the 1977–78 season saw Freiburger FC, Kickers Würzburg, VfR Oli Bürstadt and Wormatia Worms promoted to the 2. Bundesliga from the Amateurligas and Karlsruher SC relegated to the 2. Bundesliga Süd from the Bundesliga.

League table

Results

Top scorers 
The league's top scorers:

Promotion play-offs
The final place in the Bundesliga was contested between the two runners-up in the Nord and Süd divisions. 1. FC Nürnberg won on aggregate and were promoted to the Bundesliga.

References

External links
 2. Bundesliga 1977/1978 Nord at Weltfussball.de 
 2. Bundesliga 1977/1978 Süd at Weltfussball.de 
 1977–78 2. Bundesliga at kicker.de 

1977-78
2
German